Laishevo (Layış) is a town and the administrative center of Laishevsky District in the Republic of Tatarstan, Russia, located on the right bank of the Kama River on the shore of the Kuybyshev Reservoir,  southeast of the republic's capital of Kazan. As of the 2010 Census, its population was 7,735.

History
Known as Laishev since the times of the Khanate of Kazan, it was granted town status in 1781. In 1920–1927, it served as the administrative center of a kanton. In 1926, it was demoted in status to a selo and given its present name. In 1950, it was granted urban-type settlement status. It served as the administrative center of a district in 1930–1963 and then again since 1965. Town status was granted to it again in 2004.

Administrative and municipal status
Within the framework of administrative divisions, Laishevo serves as the administrative center of Laishevsky District, to which it is directly subordinated. As a municipal division, the town of Laishevo, together with the village of Staraya Pristan, is incorporated within Laishevsky Municipal District as Laishevo Urban Settlement.

Economy
As of 1997, economic activity revolved around the starch and fish-processing plants, a garment factory, and a forestry farm.

Demographics

As of 1989, the population was ethnically mostly Russian (74.9%), Tatar (21.8%), and Chuvash (1.4%).

References

Notes

Sources

External links
 Unofficial website of Laishevo

Cities and towns in Tatarstan
Laishevsky Uyezd